11 Trianguli is a solitary star located in the northern constellation Triangulum, with an apparent magnitude of 5.55. It is probably on the horizontal branch fusing helium in its core, and is calculated to be about  old. It has a stellar classification of K1 III. It has 2.446 times the mass of the Sun and 12.055 times the radius of the Sun.

References

K-type giants
Triangulum (constellation)
Trianguli, 11
015176
011432
0712
Durchmusterung objects